There are three species of fish named Malabar baril:
 Barilius bakeri
 Barilius gatensis
 Barilius malabaricus